Bay City is an Australian children's television series that first screened on the Seven Network in 1993. The thirteen part series follows the lives of four children in a small city on Australia's west coast.

Bay City was produced by Douglas Stanley, directed by Andrew Prowse and Howard Rubie and written by Roger Vaughan Carr, Ken Kelso, Murray Oliver and Trevor Todd.

Cast
 Michael Muntz as Mike Walker
 Wendy Strehlow as Sue Walker
 Christopher Fare as Steve Walker
 Isla Fisher as Vanessa Walker
 Rachel Goodman as Joanne Zandona
 Shayne Vea as Luke Carter

See also 
 List of Australian television series

References

External links
 
 Bay City at the Australian Television Information Archive

Seven Network original programming
Australian children's television series
1993 Australian television series debuts
1993 Australian television series endings
2010s Australian television series
English-language television shows